"Try Again" is a song performed and composed by English alternative rock band Keane that appears as the 10th track on their second studio album, Under the Iron Sea (2006). The song was released as the sixth single off the album only in Germany on 9 February 2007. This is also Keane's first single with three B-sides, all live performances from Cologne, Germany.

Composition and recording 
It was composed by Tim Rice-Oxley in early 2005, and first played live two weeks after composed by Rice-Oxley. The song was first played with the electric piano and a tambourine as very much a work-in-progress, and as a result was shorter than the recorded version.

The album version is a melancholic piano ballad, featuring drums, synthesizers, an extended outro, along with Rice-Oxley's electric piano. In the extended outro, distortion piano notes can also be heard from lead singer Tom Chaplin's Yamaha CP60M.

Rufus Wainwright was asked by Keane to sing this song along with Chaplin at the Wireless Music Festival on 29 June 2005. Chaplin apparently wanted Wainwright to also play the piano but he refused. The song was recorded and at the Heliosentric Studios, Rye, East Sussex and at The Magic Shop, New York City in late 2005.

Meaning 
Rice-Oxley explains his thoughts about "Try Again" on the fifth Keane podcast:

Track listings

Charts

References

External links 
 Official site
 Keaneshaped – Information about record

2006 songs
2007 singles
Island Records singles
Keane (band) songs
Rock ballads
Songs written by Richard Hughes (musician)
Songs written by Tim Rice-Oxley
Songs written by Tom Chaplin